The Momina Klisura Hydro Power Plant is an active hydro power project in the eastern Rila mountains, located at the Maritsa river near Momina Klisura village, Bulgaria. It has 4 individual turbines with a nominal output of around 30 MW which will deliver up to 120 MW of power. It is the final stage of the Belmeken-Chaira-Sestrimo Hydropower Cascade.

References

Hydroelectric power stations in Bulgaria
Buildings and structures in Pazardzhik Province